Jean-Paul Faguet is Professor of the Political Economy of Development at the London School of Economics and Political Science and author or editor of five books and many academic and news articles, including Is Decentralization Good for Development? Perspectives from Academics and Policy Makers, and Decentralization and Popular Democracy: Governance from Below in Bolivia, which won the Political Science Association’s W.J.M. Mackenzie award for best political science book of 2012. He has advised the governments of numerous developing countries, as well as the World Bank, Inter-American Development Bank and the United Nations on local government reforms, poverty alleviation programs, decentralization, and the design of social investment funds. He is ranked amongst the global top five percent of economics authors according to RePEc (Research Papers in Economics).

He is known for the "One-country, large-N" empirical approach, using blended quantitative and qualitative methods for the analysis of complex problems of political economy and public policy. He is Chair of the Decentralization Task Force at Columbia University, part of Joseph Stiglitz's Initiative for Policy Dialogue, and head of the LSE's MSc in Development Management

In 2008-09 he was a Visiting Professor at the University of California, Berkeley. Previously he worked for the World Bank in La Paz, Bolivia. He studied political science and economics at Princeton University, Harvard University and the London School of Economics, where his dissertation won the William Robson Memorial Prize.

Selected publications

Books
 Faguet, J.P. and C. Pöschl (eds.). 2015. Is Decentralization Good for Development? Perspectives from Academics and Policy Makers. Oxford: Oxford University Press.
 Faguet, JP (ed.). 2014. “Decentralization and Governance.” Special Issue of World Development, 53: 1-112.
 Faguet, JP. 2012. Decentralization and Popular Democracy: Governance from Below in Bolivia. Ann Arbor: University of Michigan Press.
 Zuazo, M, JP Faguet, and G Bonifaz (eds.). 2012. Descentralización y democratización en Bolivia: La historia del Estado débil, la sociedad rebelde y el anhelo de democracia. La Paz: Friedrich Ebert Stiftung.

Non-Academic Press
 Faguet, J.P. 21 October 2015. “Expert Commentary: Better for Business.” The Cipher Brief
 Faguet, J.P.. 15 October 2015. “Interview: After Riding Commodities Boom, Bolivia Faces Stress of Falling Prices.” World Politics Review
 Faguet, J.P. 27 October 2014. “Es notable que los países que más inversión extranjera atraen, tienden a ser federales y no unitarios.” FAO AgroNoticias América Latina y el Caribe
 Faguet, J.P. 17 September 2014. “Scottish independence: David Cameron is becoming the 'George Bush of Britain'” The Independent

References

External links
 LSE homepage
 Governance from Below website
 Video interview segments on Federalism and Industrial Policy
 Hard Talk interview (1'14") on Is decentralization good for service delivery?
 ResearchGate
 Is Decentralization Good for Development?, World Bank video seminar

University of California, Berkeley faculty
Princeton University alumni
Harvard University alumni
Columbia University faculty
British economists
British political scientists
Year of birth missing (living people)
Living people